St Luke's Church is in the village of Torver, Cumbria, England.  It is an active Anglican parish church in the deanery of Furness, the archdeaconry of Westmorland and Furness, and the diocese of Carlisle. The church is recorded in the National Heritage List for England as a designated Grade II listed building.

History

The original church was built in 1849, and designed by Miles Thompson of Kendal.  It was rebuilt in 1884 to a design by the Lancaster partnership of Paley and Austin.  It provided seating for 150 people, and cost £1,350 (equivalent to £ in ).

Architecture

St Luke's is described by the architectural historians Hyde and Pevsner as being "chunky" and "robust".    It is constructed in dressed slate with sandstone dressings and slate roofs.  Its plan consists of a three-bay nave and a chancel, with a tower between them.  On the north side is a vestry, and on the south side is a porch.  The windows and the entrance are round-headed, the entrance arch being decorated with zigzags (a motif typical of Norman architecture). At the west end are a pair of windows, and at the east end are three windows, the central one being wider than the others.  The tower has buttresses on the north and south sides, louvred bell openings, a coped cornice, and a low pyramidal roof surmounted by a fish weathervane.  Internally, the tower is supported by round arches.  The church contains a plain octagonal font.

The two-manual organ was built by Young in 1899. The organ was restored by Roger Mallinson of Windermere in 2014/2015.

Pevsner wrote that "one would have to search far and search long in England to find village churches to vie with" this and two other Austin and Paley churches, Dolphinholme and Finsthwaite.

See also

Listed buildings in Torver
List of ecclesiastical works by Paley and Austin

References

Church of England church buildings in Cumbria
Diocese of Carlisle
Grade II listed churches in Cumbria
Romanesque Revival church buildings in England
Churches completed in 1884
19th-century Church of England church buildings
Paley and Austin buildings